The 2007 Open Canada Cup was the 10th edition of the Canadian Soccer League's open league cup tournament running from July through early September. Trois-Rivières Attak defeated Columbus Clan F.C. 3-0 in the final played at Cove Road Stadium, London, Ontario. It was the Attak's first Open Canada Cup title and marked the first time in the tournament's history where a Quebec club won. The 2007 tournament was significant as it featured for the first time professional and amateur teams from Ontario, Quebec, and British Columbia.

The British Columbia teams had their own regional qualifying matches with the winner of the British Columbia Provincial Soccer Championship the Columbus Clan F.C. receiving a bye to the semi-finals. All CSL clubs competed in the competition with the exception of Toronto Croatia which opted out in order to compete in the Croatian World Club Championship and the annual Croatian-North American Soccer Tournament. The remaining Ontario club were from the Ontario Soccer League, Ottawa Carleton Soccer League, and the Western Ontario Soccer League. With the exception of Trois-Rivières the remaining  Quebec club Jean-Talon 2007 represented the Concordia Regional Soccer League. London City were awarded the hosting rights to the semi-final, and final. As the host club London City were given a wild card match if they were defeated in the earlier rounds.

Qualification

Open Canada Cup bracket
Home teams listed on top of bracket

Preliminary round (amateur teams)

Second round

Third round

Wild Card

Semifinals

Finals

Top scorers

References  

Open Canada Cup
2007 domestic association football cups
2007 in Canadian soccer